This page gathers the results of elections in Sardinia.

Regional elections

Latest regional election

The latest regional election took place on 24 February 2019. Christian Solinas of the Sardinian Action Party was elected president.

List of previous regional elections
1949 Sardinian regional election
1953 Sardinian regional election
1957 Sardinian regional election
1961 Sardinian regional election
1965 Sardinian regional election
1969 Sardinian regional election
1974 Sardinian regional election
1979 Sardinian regional election
1984 Sardinian regional election
1989 Sardinian regional election
1994 Sardinian regional election
1999 Sardinian regional election
2004 Sardinian regional election
2009 Sardinian regional election
2014 Sardinian regional election
2019 Sardinian regional election

Italian general elections in Sardinia

Latest general election

List of previous general elections
1946 Italian general election in Sardinia
1948 Italian general election in Sardinia
1953 Italian general election in Sardinia
1958 Italian general election in Sardinia
1963 Italian general election in Sardinia
1968 Italian general election in Sardinia
1972 Italian general election in Sardinia
1976 Italian general election in Sardinia
1979 Italian general election in Sardinia
1983 Italian general election in Sardinia
1987 Italian general election in Sardinia
1992 Italian general election in Sardinia
1994 Italian general election in Sardinia
1996 Italian general election in Sardinia
2001 Italian general election in Sardinia
2006 Italian general election in Sardinia
2008 Italian general election in Sardinia
2013 Italian general election in Sardinia

European Parliament elections in Sardinia

Latest European Parliament election

List of previous European Parliament elections
1979 European Parliament election in Sardinia
1984 European Parliament election in Sardinia
1989 European Parliament election in Sardinia
1994 European Parliament election in Sardinia
1999 European Parliament election in Sardinia
2004 European Parliament election in Sardinia
2009 European Parliament election in Sardinia

Provincial elections

Latest provincial elections

 
Politics of Sardinia